Gregory Garrett (March 12, 1947 – June 7, 2003) was an American professional baseball player, a left-handed pitcher who appeared in 34 Major League games (eight as a starting pitcher) over two seasons for the California Angels and Cincinnati Reds of Major League Baseball. Garrett attended Washington State University, where he played college baseball for the Cougars in the 1967 season. He was traded from the Angels to the Reds for Jim Maloney on December 15, 1970. After retiring from baseball, Garrett became a college baseball coach and later a powerlifter. He died following a lengthy battle with cancer on June 7, 2003 at the age of 56.

References

External links

1947 births
2003 deaths
California Angels players
Cincinnati Reds players
Major League Baseball pitchers
Baseball players from California
LAPC Brahma Bulls baseball players
People from Newhall, Santa Clarita, California
Deaths from cancer in California
Alaska Goldpanners of Fairbanks players
Arizona Instructional League Angels players
Arizona Instructional League Giants players
Charlotte Hornets (baseball) players
Decatur Commodores players
El Paso Sun Kings players
Indianapolis Indians players
Phoenix Giants players
Salt Lake City Giants players
San Jose Bees players